Falmouth Docks railway station is situated in Falmouth, Cornwall, England. Services are operated by Great Western Railway, who also manage the station.

History
The original Cornwall Railway Act had provided for a terminus at Falmouth on the waterfront at Greenbank.  By the time the line was built the packet ships, which had been the commercial justification for the line, no longer called there.  Instead new docks had been constructed near Pendennis Castle to which the railway was diverted. The grand Falmouth Hotel was opened in 1865 just outside the station, with sea views across Gyllyngvase beach. The railway, Falmouth docks and hotel companies shared several directors, the hotel company even leased the refreshment rooms on the station.

As no other stations were provided in the town at the time it was known just as 'Falmouth', and was opened on 24 August 1863. A siding ran down to the docks from the end of the platform. A camping coach was positioned here by the Western Region from 1962 to 1964.

The need to provide accommodation for all the staff were met by building twenty dwellings, known as Railway Cottages, in four terraces of five dwellings. These are situated just below the station by the entrance to the docks.

The Cornwall Railway was amalgamated into the Great Western Railway on 1 July 1889. The Great Western Railway was nationalised into British Railways from 1 January 1948 which was in turn privatised in the 1990s.

On 15 May 1989, both were renamed: 'Falmouth' (this station) became 'Falmouth Docks', and 'The Dell' became 'Falmouth Town'.

Stationmasters

E. Healey 1863 - 1864
Mr. Morcom 1864
Thomas Henry Hocking ca. 1865 - 1900
James Parsons 1900 - 1902 (formerly station master at )
Thomas Arthur 1919 - 1924
James Pegler 1924 - 1926 (formerly station master at )
E.S. Prior 1926 - 1929 (formerly station master at )
R.G. Randall from 1929 (formerly station master at Totnes)
J.H. Blewett from 1933
Fred Piper 1935 - 1954
A.C. Smith 1954  (formerly station master at )

Location
The station is at the south end of the town on the hillside above the docks and near Pendennis Castle and Gyllyngvase Beach. It is covered by a canopy but features a mosaic panel on its wall which depicts the link between the railway and the area's maritime heritage. It has level access from the car park.

Passenger volume
While passenger numbers have been steadily growing at most Cornish stations in recent years, the growth at Falmouth Docks has been exceptional.  More than 28,000 people passed through the station in the twelve months ending March 2003, but this had more than doubled just four years later and almost quadrupled by 2014–15.  Falmouth Town, however, continues to be the busiest of the three stations in Falmouth.

The statistics cover twelve month periods that start in April.

Services

Until 2009 they ran approximately once each hour – often much less than this – but they were then increased in frequency. They are now every 30 minutes Monday - Saturday day time and hourly at evenings and on Sundays.

Community Rail 
The railway from Truro to Falmouth is designated as a community rail line and is supported by marketing provided by the Devon and Cornwall Rail Partnership. The line is promoted under the "Maritime Line" name.

References

External links

Video footage of Falmouth Docks railway station

Buildings and structures in Falmouth, Cornwall
Railway stations in Cornwall
Former Great Western Railway stations
Railway stations in Great Britain opened in 1863
Railway stations in Great Britain closed in 1970
Railway stations in Great Britain opened in 1975
Railway stations served by Great Western Railway
Railway stations serving harbours and ports in the United Kingdom
Reopened railway stations in Great Britain
DfT Category F1 stations